is a town located in Kanagawa Prefecture, Japan. , the town had an estimated population of 39,763 and a population density of 1200 persons per km².

Geography
Aikawa is located in the foothills of northern Kanagawa Prefecture. The Nakatsu River, a tributary of the Sagami River, flows through. A portion of the Tanzawa Mountains can be found in the western part of the town. Miyagase Dam, a major source of hydroelectric power, is situated on the Nakatsu River. The highest mountain in Aikawa is Mount Takatori.

Neighboring municipalities
Kanagawa Prefecture
Sagamihara
Atsugi
Kiyokawa

Climate
Aikawa has a Humid subtropical climate (Köppen Cfa) characterized by warm summers and cool winters with light to no snowfall.  The average annual temperature in Aikawa is 13.5 °C. The average annual rainfall is 1906 mm with September as the wettest month. The temperatures are highest on average in August, at around 24.5 °C, and lowest in January, at around 2.3 °C.

Demographics
Per Japanese census data, the population of Aikawa has grown relatively steadily until around the year 2000 and is now slightly declining.

History
During the Sengoku period, the Battle of Mimasetoge between the forces of Takeda Shingen and the later Hōjō clan occurred on what is now Aikawa Town. During the Edo period, the area was tenryō territory under direct control of the Tokugawa shogunate. After the Meiji Restoration, Aikawa village was founded on April 4, 1889 with the establishment of the modern municipalities system. It was elevated to town status on April 1, 1940. The Imperial Japanese Army established the Sagami Airfield in Aikawa, which was also adjacent to military factories in Sagamihara, an officer's training school in Zama, and numerous Army and Imperial Japanese Navy facilities in Atsugi and Yokohama. On January 15, 1955, Aikawa merged with neighboring Takamine Village and on September 30, 1956, with neighboring Nakatsu Village.  In 1966, an industrial park was built on the site of the former airfield and military facilities.

Government
Aikawa has a mayor-council form of government with a directly elected mayor and a unicameral town council of 16 members. Aikawa, together with neighboring Kiyokawa, contributes one member to the Kanagawa Prefectural Assembly. In terms of national politics, the town is part of Kanagawa 16th district of the lower house of the Diet of Japan.

Economy
Aikawa has a mixed economy, supported by agriculture and light/precision industries. Makino Milling Machines has a factory in Aikawa, as does Asahi Glass Co., NHK Spring Company, Merck Pharmaceuticals and Mitsubishi Motors. The town also serves as a bedroom community for neighboring Sagamihara and Atsugi.

Education
Aikawa has six public elementary schools and three public middle schools operated by the town government. The town does not have a high school.

Transportation

Railway
Aikawa does not have any passenger railway service.

HIghway

Noted people from Aikawa
Takanori Gomi, martial artist
Daisuke Watanabe, actor
Hiroya, professional kick-boxer
Murray Sayle, journalist

References

External links

Official Website 

 
Towns in Kanagawa Prefecture